Joseph Royal Murdock (August 11, 1858 – May 26, 1931) was a member of the Utah State Senate.

Murdock was the son of Nymphas Coridon Murdock and his wife Sarah Melissa Barney. He was born and raised in Salt Lake City, Utah, until he moved to Charleston, Utah at age 13. He attended Brigham Young Academy (the predecessor of Brigham Young University) in its inaugural year. In 1878 he married Margaret Ashbridge Wright (1860–1948). They became the parents of 10 children.

From 1880 to 1882 Murdock served a mission for the LDS Church, primarily in Michigan. He was elected to the Utah State Senate in 1900. Murdock died at the age of 72 in Salt Lake City and his funeral was held in Heber City, Utah.

Sources

Andrew Jenson. LDS Biographical Encyclopedia. Vol. 1, p. 361.

1858 births
1931 deaths
Politicians from Salt Lake City
Latter Day Saints from Utah
American Mormon missionaries in the United States
Brigham Young Academy alumni
Utah state senators
People from Wasatch County, Utah